The University of Maine at Fort Kent (UMaine Fort Kent or UMFK; French: Université du Maine à Fort Kent) is a public college in Fort Kent, Maine. It is the northernmost campus of the University of Maine System. It is an academic center for Acadian and French American culture and heritage, and French-speaking Mainers from throughout the state. It currently has an enrollment of 1,557 students. The Saint John Valley region is a center of French American culture, and the majority of adults in the region are bilingual in French and English.

The college offers academic programs leading to associate and bachelor's degrees. It is classified among "Baccalaureate Colleges - General".

History
On February 21, 1878, Governor Selden Connor signed an act establishing a teachers' school in the northern border region of the state (then known as the Madawaska territory) in an effort to Americanize the French settlers of the area. This became known as the Madawaska Training School. The institution held its first classes on September 30, 1878.

In 1955 the name was changed to "Fort Kent Normal School" to more accurately reflect its location.  The name would change three more times, beginning in 1961 to become "Fort Kent State Teachers College" and then "Fort Kent State College". The institution adopted its current name in 1970.

Fiddlers Jamboree
UMFK has for many years been host to an annual Fiddlers Jamboree where it is often standing-room-only as hundreds of people gather to hear more than 40 fiddlers, guitarists, banjo pickers, drummers and accordion players from both sides of the Canada–US border. The event draws members of the New Brunswick Fiddlers’ Hall of Fame, and is an important complement to the Acadian Archives at UMFK.

Academics
The college offers several academic programs including 4 Associate of Science degrees, 1 Bachelor of Arts, and 14 Bachelor of Science degrees. The highest enrollments are in Nursing, Business Management, and Behavioral Sciences.

Acadian Archives 
The campus of the University of Maine at Fort Kent is home to the Acadian Archives, New England's premier center for the study of Acadian life. The Acadian Archives aim to document, preserve, celebrate, and disseminate the language, culture, and history of the communities of the Upper St. John Valley.

Archival collections reflect the multilayered development of the Valley with special focus on people of French descent. The historic Madawaska Territory encompassed all lands west of Grand Falls on both sides of the St. John River, up to the St. Francis River and the county of Témiscouata in Quebec. The Wəlastəkwewiyik (Maliseet) occupied the land from time immemorial. The first people of European descent to settle permanently in the region were Acadians who had fled deportation from their ancestral homes in eastern Canada. Acadians came to the Madawaska in 1785; they were joined by French Canadians in ever-rising numbers in the nineteenth century. In spite of the 1842 international boundary settlement that divided people into two nations, the region remained integrated through culture and kinship ties. Those relationships survive despite new obstacles to travel created in the wake of the attacks of 9/11 and the COVID-19 pandemic. The region still boasts the highest percentage of French descendants and the highest percentage of French-speaking people in the United States.

The Acadian Archives/Archives acadiennes secured state funding in 1989 and officially opened the following year. From the beginning, the institution aimed to share a local cultural experience that differed significantly from Franco-American communities in other parts of Maine. Archival holdings quickly grew. Besides a small collection of physical artifacts documenting the rich craft traditions of the region, they include a vast array of manuscript materials: rare newspapers like the Journal du Madawaska, nineteenth-century maps, scrapbooks, the ledgers and corporate documents of local businesses, songbooks, diaries, etc. Climate-controlled rooms notably hold 500 collections, more than 20,000 photographs, 830 audio and visual recordings, microfilm reels, and parish registers from Quebec, New Brunswick, northern Maine, and other French-heritage communities. The Archives’ oldest item is a seventeenth-century commission awarded to Charles de Saint-Etienne de la Tour for the colonization of Acadia by Louis XIV.

The Archives serve as a cultural center for the St. John Valley. The institution works with local historical societies to digitize and disseminate their materials. It hosts artistic, historical, and thematic exhibits in its gallery and invites guest speakers and musical performers. Its latest lecture series drew an audience spanning the country and speakers from New Brunswick to Louisiana. It also offers workshops, creates educational activities for public schools, and supports UMFK students as well as genealogists and historians. Finally, visitors and patrons can peruse the Archives’ specialized lending library, which boasts educational trunks about Maine’s beginnings, St. Croix Island, the story of Evangeline, and the St. John Valley in addition to thousands of circulating books.

Athletics
The Maine–Fort Kent (UMFK) athletic teams are called the Bengals. The college is a member of the United States Collegiate Athletic Association (USCAA), primarily competing as an Independent since the 2011–12 academic year. The Bengals previously participated in the Sunrise Athletic Conference of the National Association of Intercollegiate Athletics (NAIA) from 2002–03 to 2010–11.

UMFK competes in seven intercollegiate varsity sports: Men's sports include basketball, soccer and track & field; while women's sports include basketball, soccer, track & field and volleyball. UMFK also has a number of intramural teams.

Soccer 
The varsity men's soccer team won the USCAA National Championship in 2010 and 2015. It was runner up at the 2013 and 2014 tournaments. The varsity "Lady Bengals " women's soccer team won the USCAA National Championship in 2010 and 2011, and then every year from 2013 to 2017, and again in 2019. The UMFK women's soccer team also finished as the runner-up in the 2012 USCAA National Championship Tournament. Professional soccer players Matt Dunn (who plays for New York City FC) and Kimika Forbes (goalie for the Trinidad & Tobago women's national team) are UMFK alumni.

Biathlon 
In 2002, UMFK signed an agreement with the United States Biathlon Association allowing the USBA to nominate up to five biathletes for a UMFK scholarship program which allows them to attend the university at the Maine in-state tuition rate and gives them access to the university's training facilities. The agreement was also aimed at training possible Olympic contestants at the university.

UMFK also assists with the organization of Biathlon events hosted at the nearby 10th Mountain Ski Center such as the 2005, and upcoming 2009 IBU Biathlon World Cup, March 12–15, 2009, the only U.S. venue on the IBU’s 2008/09 schedule. The 2009 event is expected to host nearly 300 world-class athletes and coaches, draw hundreds of spectators to the Saint John Valley, and capture a worldwide television audience for the three-day competition.

Can-Am Crown International Sled Dog Race 
UMFK promotes new learning experiences, such as when members of the UMFK men’s soccer team from Jamaica, Trinidad, and South Africa volunteered at the start of the Can-Am Crown International Sled Dog Race in March 2009. For many of the players, it was the first time they had ever seen snow, a sled dog, or a competitive distance race.

Notable people

Alumni
 Kimika Forbes, association football goalkeeper for Trinidad and Tobago women's national football team
 Helen Hamlin (1917 - 2004), author of two books on northern Maine

See also
University of Maine System
Fort Kent, Maine

References

External links
 Official website
 Official athletics website

 
Fort Kent
University of Maine at Fort Kent
Educational institutions established in 1878
University of Maine at Fort Kent
USCAA member institutions
University of Maine Fort Kent
1878 establishments in Maine